Barnham is a village and civil parish in the West Suffolk district of the English county of Suffolk about  south of Thetford and  north of Bury St Edmunds on the A134. According to the Swedish scholar Eilert Ekwall, the name of the village means "Beorn's homestead".

Prehistory
East Farm, Barnham, is an important archaeological site dating back to the Hoxnian Stage of the Lower Palaeolithic (about 400,000 years ago). Flint artefacts have also been found.

History
The Domesday Book of 1086 records that Barnham housed 35 families, which meant it was a large village by the standards of the time. It was part of the holdings of Earl Hugh of Chester, having been held by Edward the Confessor in 1066. The parish church, dedicated to St Gregory, was heavily restored in the 19th century. The village used to be split into two parishes, divided between the liberties of St Edmund and of Thetford until 1639. Ruins of the other church, dedicated to St Martin, can still be seen.

From 1808 to 1814, Barnham had a station in the shutter telegraph chain, which connected the Admiralty in London to its naval ships in the port of Great Yarmouth. Barnham railway station on the Thetford to Bury St Edmunds line closed in 1960. Barnham Windmill was a three-storey tower mill built in the village in 1821. It has been converted into residential accommodation.

RAF Barnham

The base was opened in 1939 and used as a chemical weapons store during and after the Second World War. In the 1950s, a nuclear weapons store facility was built on part of the site to store the UK's free-fall nuclear bombs for the Blue Danube project. The site is known to have been operational as a nuclear store in September 1956, commanded from RAF Honington,  to the south, but it is believed to have stopped in 1963, after the development of the Blue Steel missile programme. The nuclear facility was closed in 1966 and became an industrial site. However, it is a scheduled monument and several buildings on it have listed building status.

Barnham Camp remains a training site for the RAF Regiment as a satellite camp to RAF Honington.

Barnham Heath SSSI
Barnham Heath is a Site of Special Scientific Interest to the east of the village. Its  consist of Breckland heath with a range of grassland and scrub habitats. It is an important bird habitat, including the protected stone curlew (B. oedicnemus). Land surrounding the village also forms part of the Breckland Farmland and Breckland Forest SSSIs as well as the Barnham Little Heath and Thetford Heaths SSSI.

References

External links

Villages in Suffolk
Civil parishes in Suffolk
Borough of St Edmundsbury